Worcester House may refer to: 

Worcester Park House, a now ruined building built in 1607 for or by the 4th Earl of Worcester in Worcester Park in Surrey in the United Kingdom
 Worcester House (Lowell), a registered historic place in Lowell, Massachusetts in the United States of America